New York State Markers was a state historic marker program. This was managed by the Education Department's State History office from 1926 to 1966.  There are an estimated 2,800 historic markers around the state. The markers tell about historic events and locations and provide the public with knowledge about the state of New York. It is no longer a requirement to have a new marker approved by the Education Department and SED as long as they are located on private property. Historic Markers have become a major way to inform the public and tourists of local history.

First created to commemorate the American Revolution the markers were loved by the public and deemed a success. Although no longer funded by the State, markers are still being installed throughout New York State today by individuals, town and county governments, and historical organizations. The Walton East Branch Foundry (one of the companies that casts the markers) reports creating up to 100 markers per year.

History 
The State Historic Marker Program was started in 1926 by the New York State Education Department to acknowledge the Sesquicentennial (115 years) of the American Revolution. During this time over 2,800 small blue cast iron site markers with yellow lettering were placed all over the state of New York during the time of the program (1926-1939). While the program lost public funding during this time period, the movement to locate and publicize local historic sites continues to be a vital resource for local historic preservation efforts continuing today.
During the 1960s public funding was granted once again for placement at rest stops along the State's interstate highways and thruway. With new advances in automobiles during the 1960s cars could go much faster. It was now considered unsafe to erect small historic signs along the side of major highways. Funding then was only granted to larger, more detailed signs in places such as rest areas. During the 1960s this was a major advancement providing visitors with cultural information in a setting along routes with heavy traffic. 
These markers provide an overview of the History of New York, pointing out local history that makes that particular place unique and interesting. In 1970 a booklet was released containing all the text of the rest area markers. You can still purchase these booklets today from the State Museum Publications Unit.

History of operations
During the early period of the historic markers (1926–1939), the State Historian [SED] dispersed applications throughout the state to be reviewed and approved. The State then paid for the casting of the markers and planned their installation. Records of these markers were kept, and are available from the State Archives.

During the 1960s–1970s, installation of historic markers was encouraged at county and town level, SED approval was necessary. While during this time no state funding was available, private funds were forced to be raised. Signs were required to be cast at the Walton East Branch Foundry; this was the only place that had the molds for the markers already cast. The foundry required a letter from the state notifying them of the approval before production of the sign would begin. This insured no markers would be created without the States approval.

Throughout the 1980s, restrictions of the SED mandate cause the process to be revised. Today you must supply fact sheets to the field so that it may be entered into the data base of county listings of existing markers. Still today there is much interest in erecting new markers and replacing old ones. Grants such as those given out by the William G. Pomeroy Foundation provide funding for new markers.

The foundry supplies as many as 75–100 orders a year. Unless erected on state land permission to erect a marker is no longer required. Thus the current data base lacks some markers erected after the 1970s.

William G. Pomeroy Foundation 
The William G. Pomeroy Foundation is private foundation that promotes the importance of local historic preservation and the roles markers play in all towns across the state of New York. These markers can provide much needed economic assistance to small towns and villages where the markers are erected. The program recognizes historic people, places and things within 1740–1917 by providing grants to build new historic markers.

The Foundation unveiled its Historic Roadside Marker Program in 2006 to place markers in towns and villages within Onondaga County. In 2010, the program grew to counties in New York including Cayuga County, Cortland County, Madison County, and Oswego County, as possible grant recipients.  The next year the program continued expanding to include Erie County and Genesee County.  In April 2012 the program began including all municipalities and not for profit organizations as eligible grant recipients.  As of January 2019 The William G. Pomeroy Foundation reported funding over 550 Historic Markers in 51 New York counties.

Today 
New York Historic markers play a large role in educating the public as well as tourists of historic events. The William G. Pomeroy Foundation helps fund projects to continue to erect such markers. Currently there is no red tape or approval process for historic markers if placed on private land; although it is advised contacting a local historian before erecting such marker. When placing on state property there is an application process and you must have the text reviewed by the SED.

See also
List of New York State Historic Markers

References 

 
 
 
 
 
 
 
 

History of New York (state)
Historical markers in the United States
New York State Education Department